"Ships That Don't Come In" is a song recorded by American country music singer Joe Diffie that reached the Top 5 on the Billboard Hot Country Singles & Tracks (now Hot Country Songs) chart in 1992.  It was released in April 1992 as the second single from his album Regular Joe.  The song was written by Paul Nelson and Dave Gibson the latter of whom was also recording for Epic as a member of the Gibson/Miller Band at the time.

Content
The song features two men philosophizing about the nature of life while having a conversation at a bar.

Music video
The music video was directed by Jack Cole and premiered in mid-1992.

Chart performance
The song debuted at number 68 on the Hot Country Singles & Tracks chart dated April 18, 1992. It charted for 20 weeks on that chart, reaching its peak of number 5 on the chart dated July 10, 1992.

Year-end charts

References

External links
Lyrics at CMT.com

1992 singles
Joe Diffie songs
Song recordings produced by Bob Montgomery (songwriter)
Epic Records singles
Songs written by Paul Nelson (songwriter)
Songs written by Dave Gibson (American songwriter)
1992 songs